Bella Li (born 1983) is a Chinese-born Australian poet.

Early life and career 
Li was born in China in 1983. When she was three she and parents migrated to Australia. Li has an Arts/Law degree from the University of Melbourne. In 2020 she received a PhD from the same university for her thesis, "The Forest, the Desert and the Road: Chronotopes of American Spaces in Twentieth-century Long-form Poetry; and a Creative Work, 'Hotel America'".

Her poetry has appeared in Meanjin, Cordite and other literary journals. In 2017 Li was awarded a literary grant by the Australia Council. She served as a judge for the 2020 Overland Judith Wright Poetry Prize.

Awards and recognition 

 Shortlisted, University of Melbourne's Australian Centre Literary Awards, Wesley Michel Wright Prize, 2014 for Maps, Cargo 
 Highly commended, Anne Elder Award, 2017 for Argosy
 Shortlisted, Red Room Poetry fellowship, 2017
 Commended, University of Melbourne's Australian Centre Literary Awards, Wesley Michel Wright Prize, 2017 for Argosy
 Winner, Victorian Premier's Literary Awards Poetry Prize, 2018 for Argosy
 Winner, NSW Premier's Literary Awards Kenneth Slessor Prize for Poetry, 2018 for Argosy
 Shortlisted, Queensland Literary Awards Judith Wright Calanthe Award, 2018 for Lost Lake
 Shortlisted, NSW Premier's Literary Awards Kenneth Slessor Prize for Poetry, 2022 for Theory of Colour

Works 

 Maps, Cargo, Vagabond Press, 2013
 Argosy, Vagabond Press, 2017, 
 Lost Lake, Vagabond Press, 2018, 
 Theory of Colour, Vagabond Press, 2021,

References

External links 

 2013 photograph of Bella Li by Nicholas Walton-Healey is held in the State Library of Victoria
 

1983 births
Living people
Australian women poets
University of Melbourne alumni